The 1993-94 season was Maccabi Haifa's 33rd season in Israeli Premier League, and their 9th consecutive season in the top division of Israeli football.

After winning the State Cup in the previous season the team started the season with the Cup Winners' Cup, where they advanced to the second round (last 16) and managed to beat AC Parma – winners of the previous edition and eventual finalists – in Italy, before being eliminated on penalties. In domestic competitions, the club won the league championship after going undefeated for the entire season, qualifying to the Champions League for the next season. The club also won the Toto Cup.

As previous manager Shlomo Scharf was appointed as manager of the Israel national football team ahead of the 1994 World Cup qualification campaign, the club appointed Giora Spiegel as their new head coach.

Cup Winners' Cup

Liga Leumit

State Cup

Squad statistics

See also
List of unbeaten football club seasons

References

Maccabi Haifa F.C. seasons
Maccabi Haifa